is a Japanese footballer currently playing as a forward for Albirex Niigata (S).

Club career

High school
While in junior high school, Kunori played for the academy of professional club Kyoto Sanga. He played as a midfielder, but his opportunities were limited due to the form of Shimpei Fukuoka and Genki Egawa. Having failed to establish himself in the Kyoto Sanga youth team, he moved to Higashiyama High School, where he was converted to a striker, and established himself in the team.

University
Kunori committed to playing football at Kansai University. He scored once in the 2022 Emperor's Cup, in a 2–0 win over FC Osaka.

Professional
In January 2023, it was announced that Kunori would join Singaporean club Albirex Niigata Singapore for the 2023 season. He made his debut in the Singapore Community Shield, scoring once in a 3–0 win against Hougang United.

Style of play
A forward with good technique, skilful dribbling and pinpoint passing ability, Kunori is also highly regarded for his vision and situational awareness. He has been compared to fellow Japanese footballer Daichi Kamada for his style of play.

Career statistics

Club
.

Notes

References

2001 births
Living people
Association football people from Kyoto Prefecture
Kansai University alumni
Japanese footballers
Association football forwards
Kyoto Sanga FC players
Albirex Niigata Singapore FC players
Japanese expatriate footballers
Japanese expatriate sportspeople in Singapore
Expatriate footballers in Singapore